Filip Škrteľ (born 10 August 2002) is a Slovak professional footballer who currently plays for Spartak Myjava as a striker.

Club career

FK Pohronie
Škrteľ made his Fortuna Liga debut for Pohronie in an away fixture against ViOn Zlaté Moravce on 24 August 2021. He came on to replace Daniel Ściślak mere five minutes before stoppage time. Pohronie was already trailing 1–0, following a goal by Marián Chobot, from earlier in the second half. The match concluded with the same score.

Personal life
Škrteľ studied at a sports gymnasium in Žilina. Škrteľ is related to a former Slovak international defender and captain Martin Škrteľ, who is the cousin of Filip's father Roman.

References

External links
 
 Futbalnet profile 
 

2002 births
Living people
People from Handlová
Sportspeople from the Trenčín Region
Slovak footballers
Association football forwards
FK Pohronie players
MFK Nová Baňa players
Slovak Super Liga players
3. Liga (Slovakia) players